Saint-Roch-Ouest is a municipality in Montcalm Regional County Municipality in the Lanaudière region of Quebec, Canada. Ouest is French for "west", indicating its position in relation to Saint-Roch-de-l'Achigan.

History
Saint-Roch-Ouest was formed in 1921 when it separated from the Parish Municipality of Saint-Roch.

Economy
The relatively rich soils encouraged agricultural activity all throughout its history and Saint-Roch-Ouest has retained agriculture as the most important economic sector. All land of the municipality is occupied by agricultural activity, in particular vegetable production and the cultivation of cereals. Additionally, there are also pork breeders and dairy farms.

Demographics
Population trend:
 Population in 2011: 267 (2006 to 2011 population change: -6.3%)
 Population in 2006: 285
 Population in 2001: 310
 Population in 1996: 350 (or 312 when adjusted to 2001 boundaries)
 Population in 1991: 357

Private dwellings occupied by usual residents: 97 (total dwellings: 102)

Mother tongue:
 English as first language: 0%
 French as first language: 100%
 English and French as first language: 0%
 Other as first language: 0%

Education

The Sir Wilfrid Laurier School Board operates anglophone public schools, including:
 Joliette Elementary School in Saint-Charles-Borromée
 Joliette High School in Joliette

References

Incorporated places in Lanaudière
Municipalities in Quebec